Alpha 4 is a science fiction anthology edited by American writer Robert Silverberg, first published in 1973.

Contents
Introduction by Robert Silverberg
"Casablanca" by Thomas M. Disch
"Dio"' by Damon Knight
"Eastward Ho!" by William Tenn
"Judas Danced" by Brian W. Aldiss
"Angel's Egg" by Edgar Pangborn
"In His Image" by Terry Carr
"All Pieces of a River Shore" by R.A. Lafferty
"We All Die Naked" by James Blish
"Carcinoma Angels" by Norman Spinrad
"Mother" by Philip José Farmer
"5,271,009" by Alfred Bester

References
 Goodreads listing for Alpha 4
 MIT Science Fiction Society's Library Pinkdex Entry for Alpha 4

1973 anthologies
Science fiction anthologies
Robert Silverberg anthologies
Ballantine Books books